Habu Chandra Raja Gobu Chandra Montri is a Bengali  fantasy comedy film directed by Aniket Chattopadhyay under the banner of Dev Entertainment Ventures. The film is based on stories by Dakshinaranjan Mitra Majumder. It had a direct television premiere on Jalsha Movies on 10 October 2021 coinciding with Puja holidays.

Plot 
The film tells the story of a king named Hobu Chandra, who was the king of Bombagarh. He was very kind and generous. His subjects were happy and content. There was enough food and drink for everyone. The king had a wise octogenarian prime minister who used to give good advice to him. Everyone in Bombagarh was happy with their king and prime minister.

Then the king married the princess Kusumkumari of Chandragarh. It was a time of celebration. There were magic, song and dance performances. And then one day the king saw someone standing and staring at them, his dress and look was not like the others, he seemed to be a foreigner in Bombagarh. The king called him. The man came and introduced himself as Gobu Chandra from Gujjar Kingdom.

Gobu proved that he can make money out of thin air. The king became happy and Gobu convinced him to make him the new Mantri, replacing and firing the old Mantri. This changes everything. Gobu also gives the Raja and Rani special glasses which show them a false reality where their subjects are happy and satisfied. The kingdom is now in chaos.

The King takes many nonsensical decisions advised by Gobi. When sweet sellers tell the King that they face severe loss as their sweets won't sell, the King makes price of Rasgulla same as the price of puffed rice (Muri).

When a thief dies by a wall falling on him, Gobi tries to find a murderer, when there clearly is none. First accused is the creator of the wall which fell on the thief. He further accuses the labor who made the wall. The labor then accuses the person who gave him the mud to make the wall. The person who made the mud, accuses a shepherd for making his mud soft by having his cows shit on it. The innocent shepherd is sentenced to death.

The death sentence of the Shepherd fails due to his extreme light weight. The townsmen laugh at the King and his administration. Gobi brings a fat person to die instead of the shepherd. The fat person is friends with a Sanyas, who also happens to be a friend to the previous Minister. The Sanyas along with a powerful Magician, plots a way to make the King fire Gobu.

The next day, when the fat person is about to be killed, he smilingly tells the King to do the job fast, by the instructions of the Sanyas. The Sanyas then appears to the King, describing how he is a powerful Mahapurush, like he is. To prove his word, he even tells the King about things from his life no one has ever known. The King, satisfied, believes the Sanyas. The Sanyas then tells the King, he must put his Minister to death instead. He then says that if he isn't put to death, all his subjects would bleed and die. When Gobu questions the Sanyas' legitimacy, the King denies killing Gobu. Then the Magician we saw earlier makes many townsmen bleed from their mouth, just as the Sanyas had said. The Sanyas' legitimacy is proved, and the King thinks about putting Gobu to the death sentence.

Gobu is frightened, and tells the King the truth so that he fires him. The King, furious by knowing the truth, orders that Gobu should be kicked out of the Kingdom. The Sanyas then proceeds to tell the King and Queen about the suffering of the people, and the magic in the glasses. The King and Queen throw away the glasses, and ask the Sanyas what should they do. The Sanyas tells them to hire their old Minister. The King and Queen, then ask the Sanyas, wouldn't that mean that the Old Minister will be put to death? The Sanyas then reveals it was a lie, so that Gobu reveals the truth. Gobu is then kicked out of the Kingdom, while the townsmen throw eggs, tomatoes, etc. on him. The Kingdom now lives Happily Ever After.

In a mid-credits scene, we see Gobu telling the audience that he will return, and take revenge.

Cast 
 Saswata Chatterjee as Raja Hobu Chondro
 Kharaj Mukhopadhyay as Mantri Gobu Chondro
 Arpita Chatterjee as Rani Kusumkali
 Subhasish Mukherjee as Briddha Mantri Manabendra
 Barun Chanda as Gurudeb

Release 
It released on Jalsha Movies on 10 October 2021 coinciding with Puja holidays.

Reception
Author Suman Sen said, though it is promoted as a film for children, actually it is not.

External links

References 

Bengali-language Indian films
2021 films
Film directors from Kolkata
2020s Bengali-language films
Films postponed due to the COVID-19 pandemic
Films directed by Aniket Chattopadhyay
Films produced by Dev (Bengali actor)
2021 comedy-drama films